Éric Dumont is a former French offshore professional sailor who participated in the 1996–1997 Vendée Globe in the yacht Café Legal-Le Goût and again in 2000–2001 Vendée Globe onboard Euroka Services where he retired due to rudder damage. Dumont announced his retirement from the sport in 2003 after a minor collision with another yacht result in the breaking of his thigh bone.

References

External links 
  Éric Dumont Home Page

French male sailors (sport)
1996 Vendee Globe sailors
2000 Vendee Globe sailors
French Vendee Globe sailors
Vendée Globe finishers
Single-handed circumnavigating sailors
Living people
Year of birth missing (living people)